The Hawaii Belt Road is a modern name for the Māmalahoa Highway and consists of Hawaii state Routes 11, 19, and 190 that encircle the Island of Hawaii. The southern section, between Hilo and Kailua-Kona is numbered as Route 11. The section between Hilo and Waimea is Route 19. Between Waimea and Kailua-Kona, the road is split in two: the original "mauka" route (now Route 190) and a "makai" Route 19, completed in 1975, which serves as access to the Kona and Kohala Coast resorts. In the Hawaiian language, mauka means "towards the mountain" and makai means "towards the sea". These terms are commonly used in travel directions.

Parts of the southern half of the Hawaii Belt Road were known during the Territorial days as the Kaū Belt Road. The names "Hawaii Belt Road" and "Māmalahoa Highway" refer to the road system that encircles the entire island; many sections are also referenced by local names.

History
Māmalahoa Highway was named for the royal decree by King Kamehameha I after an incident he and his party experienced in 1783.

As he prepared to unite the islands of Hawaii, Kamehameha I would conduct shoreline raids on the neighboring ahupuaa (traditional land divisions).  It was on one such incursion that the King's warriors encountered two local fishermen along the Puna coast.  The two fled to warn others of the pending attack and Kamehameha and his men took chase.  When they crossed a lava field, one of the King's feet got caught in a crevice.

The fishermen, seizing the opportunity to retaliate, returned and attacked.  In the ensuing brawl, one of the King's steersmen was killed and Kamehameha himself received a blow to the head that was so hard that it splintered the man's weapon – a solid koa canoe paddle.  The two Puna men escaped.

Kamehameha I opted not to retaliate but instead took this as a lesson: The strong must not mistreat the weak, his people must be assured protection from harm's way in their pursuits and that safe passage must be everyone's entitlement.  A decade later, King Kamehameha I, upon reflecting on his deliverance that day in Puna and on the memory of his fallen warrior, proclaimed Ke Kānāwai Māmalahoe – "The Law of the Splintered Paddle" – at Kahaleioleole in the Kaipalaoa area of Hilo.

 is considered such an important law to the Hawaiians that at the 1978 Constitutional Convention it was added to the Constitution of Hawaii.  In it, the law protects the public and the safety of all who travel throughout the Islands, including fishermen, gatherers, hunters and visitors alike.

 Hawaii Constitution (Article IX, Section 10) — Public Safety
 The Law of the Splintered Paddle, [as] decreed by Kamehameha I, [that] every elderly person, woman and child lie by the roadside in safety, shall be a unique and living symbol of the State's concern for public safety.  The State shall have the power to provide for the safety of the people from crimes against persons and property.
 (Add ConCon 1978 and election November 7, 1978.)

The Māmalahoa trail was a foot trail built in the nineteenth century, which developed into this highway. Various parts were widened and re-aligned over the years.
Much of the Hawaii Belt Road through North Hilo and Hāmākua districts was built on the roadbed and bridges of the Hawaii Consolidated Railway as part of the recovery from a tsunami that ravaged the island's northeast coast in 1946.

In 2007, Queen Ka‘ahumanu Highway was widened to four lanes from Henry Street in Kailua-Kona to Kealakehe Parkway. In September 2015, ground broke to extend the widening project from Kealakehe Parkway to Keāhole Airport Road, which provides access to Ellison Onizuka Kona International Airport. The project is expected to cost $105 million and be completed in November 2018.

Route description

Route 11
The mile 0 marker is at the intersection of Kamehameha Avenue (Route 19), Banyan Drive and Kanoelehua Avenue in Hilo. After about a mile is the intersection with Pūāinakō Street (Route 2000), which connects to the Saddle Road. Route 11 then continues along Kanoelehua Avenue towards Keaau where it becomes Volcano Highway near milepost 4 before crossing into Puna District.  Volcano Highway intersects with the terminus of Keaau-Pāhoa Road (Route 130) past mile 6 and Old Keaau-Pāhoa Road (Route 130), then continues through the towns of Kurtistown, Mountain View, Glenwood and Volcano Village.

Just beyond the Kaū District line, the entrance to Hawaii Volcanoes National Park at mile 28 marks another name change, back to Māmalahoa Highway.  The two lane road crests just before the mile 30 marker and then heads down a long downhill stretch through the  Kaū desert towards the black sands of Punaluu Beach Park, passing macadamia orchards near the town of Pāhala at mile 51 and the Sea Mountain Resort in Nīnole at mile 56.

Next are Nāālehu (mile 63), the southernmost community in the US, and Waiōhinu (mile 65) which was a retreat for Mark Twain.  A winding uphill climb yields to a meandering country lane where South Point Road, near mile 69, leads to Ka Lae (south point).

Another comfortable stretch of two lane road and a return to highway speeds begins past the mile 71 marker.  Māmalahoa Highway crosses Mauna Loa's 1907 Lava Flow — there is a scenic point at mile 75 — before passing through Ocean View between Tiki Lane and Aloha Boulevard.  Just past mile 82 is the South Kona District line.

Starting at mile 89, Māmalahoa Highway has sharp curves and a steep drop-off along the coastal side.  Many small fishing villages dot the coast, including Milolii, Pāpā Bay, Kona Paradise and Hookena.  The macadamia orchards soon give way to another tree crop.  This is Kona coffee Country.

Keala o Keawe Road (Route 160), just before mile 104, serves as access to Puuhonua o Hōnaunau National Historic Park and St. Benedict's Catholic Church.  Further along is the town of Captain Cook, named for the famed English explorer Captain James Cook.  Nāpōopoo Road (Route 160) leads down to Nāpōopoo and Kealakekua Bay, site of the monument to Cook's death.

After mile 111 come the towns of Kealakekua, Kainaliu and Honalo.  At "Coffee Junction" (mile 114), Māmalahoa Highway continues straight and eventually becomes Route 180, Route 11 veers to left and becomes Kuakini Highway. A  stretch from Honalo and then along the upper road until it rejoins the main Belt Road at Palani Junction  is under consideration to be designated a National Scenic Byway. It was called the Kona Heritage Corridor by the state. A somewhat steep descent off Puuloa drops into the town of Kailua-Kona.

Just past Lako Street is where Kuakini Highway branches to the left and Highway 11 becomes Queen Kaahumanu Highway.  In the vicinity of mile 121, Hualālai Road (Route 182, incorrectly signed as "180") crosses at an exaggerated angle (a rare concurrent route). Route 11 finally reaches the crossroads  of the “Queen K” and Palani Road, pinpointing the termini of all three Hawaii Belt Road route numbers.

Route 19
Tucked away at the gates to Hilo Wharf on Kūhiō Street is the mile 0 marker for Route 19. One block later, it then turns right onto Kalanianaole Avenue, running between the waters of Hilo Bay and the Runway 8/26 of Hilo International Airport, before crossing Kanoelehua Avenue (Route 11) and Banyan Drive where the name changes to Kamehameha Avenue.  Flanking the Wailoa River (Hawaii) Bridge is the 1960 Tsunami Memorial Clock with its hands frozen at the moment the killer waves struck early morning on May 23, 1960.

The highway continues along Kamehameha Avenue, paralleling a closed section of Bayfront Highway (used as access and parking for Hilo Bayfront Park), then turns right onto Pauahi Street before quickly turning left onto the open section of Bayfront Highway.  Bayfront Highway, which serves as a bypass for the downtown business district of Hilo, is often closed to traffic by the Hawaii County Police Department in times of high surf.

Past the intersection with Waiānuenue Avenue (Route 200, known as the Saddle Road), Route 19 crosses over the Wailuku River via a converted railroad plate girder bridge with a metal grate roadway that causes tires to “sing” as vehicles pass over it. Leaving Hilo, the route assumes the name Hawaii Belt Road, leaving Māmalahoa Highway to the older decommissioned portions of the original thoroughfare. Many former sugarcane plantation towns dot the highway, including Wainaku, Paukaa and Pāpaikou.

Shortly after the mile 7 marker, part of the old Māmalahoa Highway crosses Hawaii Belt Road. The road to the right leads down the “Onomea Scenic Drive,” a  loop road that crosses several one-lane wooden bridges and past the Hawaii Tropical Botanical Garden overlooking Onomea Bay before returning to Hawaii Belt Road at mile 10 in Pepeekeō.

Hawaii Belt Road meets the rugged Hāmākua coastline near mile 12. These waters empty in the Pacific Ocean at Kolekole Beach Park past mile 14.

The Hakalau Bridge carries Route 19 from the South Hilo District to North Hilo District. A number of cascades are visible from the road on the “mauka” side of the highway. Umauma Falls lies inside the World Botanical Gardens, but two other falls are viewed from the Umauma Bridge (between mile 16 and mile 17).  Between mile 18 and mile 19 is Nānue Stream with another picturesque waterfall.

The highway negotiates three sharp curves: Maulua (mile 22), Laupāhoehoe (mile 26) and Kaawalii (mile 28). Maulua Gulch has a small waterfall emptying into the ocean (visible from the Hilo side by looking across the gulch) and another in the back part of the gorge near the base of the radio tower.  Also, an abandoned railroad tunnel is sometimes visible from the Hāmākua side.  The Laupāhoehoe Railroad Museum is located on the “mauka” side past mile 25. On the other side of Laupāhoehoe Gulch, an access road leads down to Laupāhoehoe Point Beach Park where the victims of the 1946 “April Fool’s Day” tsunami are memorialized.  Past Kaawalii Gulch lie the much-welcomed passing lanes as Highway 19 goes by the old sugarmill town of Oōkala.

The Hāmākua District begins on the opposite side of Kaula Bridge (mile 30).  Highway speeds are now the norm but caution must be observed when crossing the narrow “Curved Bridge” near mile 32. This bridge was replaced in May 2010 by a new bridge with less curvature. Hamlets with names like Kūkaiau, Paauilo, Kalōpā and Pāauhau were once homes for sugar plantation workers from places like the Philippines, China and Japan.

Māmane Street (Route 240, mile 42) spurs off to the right to become the main street of Honokaa before providing access to Waipio Valley. Old Māmalahoa Highway branches uphill to wind through rugged hills of Āhualoa and is a scenic but slower route to Waimea. Meanwhile, Hawaii Belt Road makes its way through fog-shrouded eucalyptus stands.

The Old Māmalahoa Highway rejoins Route 19 near mile 52 where they cross into South Kohala District. Now again called Māmalahoa Highway, Route 19 continues into the town of Waimea (known as Kamuela by the Post Office), the headquarters for Parker Ranch and the heart of paniolo (Hawaiian cowboy) country.

At mile 57, the route turns right onto Lindsey Road (see Route 190). One block down, Route 19 spurs left onto Kawaihae Road, past a row of restaurants and before starting downhill towards the coast.  Just beyond mile 59 is a “Y” junction with Kohala Mountain Road (Route 250) in front of Hawaii Preparatory Academy.

Queen Kaahumanu Highway begins at the "T" intersection with Akoni Pule Highway (Route 270) past mile 67 outside Kawaihae. Completed in 1975, “The Queen K” connects the resort properties of Mauna Kea Beach (mile 68), Mauna Lani (mile 73), Waikōloa Beach (mile 76) and Kaūpūlehu (mile 87) with the Keāhole-Kona International Airport (mile 83) and the town of Kailua-Kona. Some beaches include Hāpuna, Holoholokai, Anaehoomalu, Makalawena, Kekaha Kai State Park and Kaloko-Honokōhau.

The terminus of Route 19 is at the crossroads of Palani Road (Route 190) at mile 100 where Queen Kaahumanu Highway continues as Route 11.

Route 190

The continuation of Māmalahoa Highway from the Lindsey Road (Route 19) intersection is the beginning of Route 190 with the mile 0 marker posted on the corner.  This was the original Hilo-to-Kona link which served as Highway 19 until the route was reassigned in 1975 to the newly opened Queen Kaahumanu Highway along the coast.

The road subsequently runs past Camp Tarawa, the Parker Ranch headquarters and the Waimea-Kohala Airport before traversing the rolling pasturelands of the South Kohala District.

Few intersections are found along the next . Saddle Road (Route 200) comes to its western terminus near mile 6 and Waikōloa Road ends its  climb from Queen Kaahumanu Highway at Māmalahoa Highway's mile 11 marker.  There are some sharp curves as the old road passes Puu Lani Ranch (mile 20) in Puuanahulu and the entrance to Puu Waawaa Forest Reserve. A long narrow strip of asphalt stretches across the windswept rangelands and lava fields covered with fountain grass.

As the road passes through a stand of eucalyptus and ohia trees near mile 31, the upland neighborhoods of the North Kona District come into view: Kalaoa, Kona Palasades Estates, Koloko Mauka and Honokōhau. On the other side of mile 35, a traffic light at the top of Hina Lani Street provides access to a Costco store.

At a 3-way intersection, the Māmalahoa Highway turns left and becomes Route 180, while Route 190 continues straight, becoming Palani Road. Palani descends steeply towards Kailua-Kona, making many quick turns and narrow curves. Palani Road meets Queen Kaahumanu Highway, marking the end of the route, though Palani Road continues downhill to its junction with Kuakini Highway and Alii Drive.

Major intersections

Main route (Routes 11 and 19)

Inland route (Route 190)

{{HIint
|location=Kailua-Kona
|mile=38.97
|type=trans
|road=
|notes=Eastern terminus at the makai route}}

See also
 Ala Kahakai National Historic Trail

References

 Juvik, Sonia P., 1998, Atlas of Hawaii'', University of Hawaii Press,

External links

Big Island and Hawaii Belt at Oscar Voss’ Hawaii Highways

Roads in Hawaii
Transportation in Hawaii County, Hawaii